The 2006 Brent London Borough Council  election took place on 4 May 2006 to elect members of Brent London Borough Council in London, England. The whole council was up for election and the Labour Party lost overall control of the council to no overall control.

Background
Since the last election in 2002, a Conservative councillor, Carol Shaw of Brondesbury Park ward, had defected to the Liberal Democrats, while in April 2006, Labour councillor, Jonathan Davies of Queen's Park ward; also joined the Liberal Democrats. In the Brent area, the Liberal Democrats had also gained the parliamentary seat of Brent East from Labour at a 2003 by-election and held the seat at the 2005 general election. The defections meant that before the election Labour had 34 seats on the council, compared to 15 for the Conservatives and 11 for the Liberal Democrats.

Election result
The Liberal Democrats gained 18 seats to leave no party with a majority on the council, but the Liberal Democrats became the largest party with 27 councillors. The Liberal Democrat gains were mainly at the expense of Labour, who suffered a net loss of 14 seats.

Following the election a coalition between the Liberal Democrats and Conservatives took control of the council, with Liberal Democrat Paul Lorber becoming the leader of the council and Conservative Bob Blackman deputy leader.

|}

Ward results

References

2006
2006 London Borough council elections